Bekir Sami Bey may refer to:

 Bekir Sami Kunduh (1867–1933), foreign minister of the government of the Grand National Assembly
 Bekir Sami Günsav (1879–1934), officer of the Ottoman Army and a commander of the Turkish War of Independence
 Bekir Sami Daçe, Turkish politician, one of the founding members of the  Right Path Party